Ekistics is the science of human settlements including regional, city, community planning and dwelling design. Its major incentive was the emergence of increasingly large and complex conurbations, tending even to a worldwide city.  The study involves every kind of human settlement, with particular attention to geography, ecology, human psychology, anthropology, culture, politics, and occasionally aesthetics.

As a scientific mode of study, ekistics currently relies on statistics and description, organized in five ekistic elements or principles: nature, anthropos, society, shells, and networks. It is generally a more scientific field than urban planning, and has considerable overlap with some of the less restrained fields of architectural theory.

In application, conclusions are drawn aimed at achieving harmony between the inhabitants of a settlement and their physical and socio-cultural environments.

Etymology
The term ekistics was coined by Constantinos Apostolos Doxiadis in 1942. The word is derived from the Greek adjective  more particularly from the neuter plural . The ancient Greek adjective  meant . All these words grew from the verb , and were ultimately derived from the noun , .

The Shorter Oxford English Dictionary contains a reference to an ecist, oekist or oikist, defining him as: "the founder of an ancient Greek ... colony". The English equivalent of oikistikē is ekistics (a noun). In addition, the adjectives ekistic and ekistical, the adverb ekistically, and the noun ekistician are now also in current use.

Scope
In terms of outdoor recreation, the term ekistic relationship is used to describe one's relationship with the natural world and how they view the resources within it.

The notion of ekistics implies that understanding the interaction between and within human groups—infrastructure, agriculture, shelter, function (job)—in conjunction with their environment directly affects their well-being (individual and collective). The subject begins to elucidate the ways in which collective settlements form and how they inter-relate. By doing so, humans begin to understand how they 'fit' into a species, i.e. Homo sapiens, and how Homo sapiens 'should' be living in order to manifest our potential—at least as far as this species is concerned (as the text stands now).  Ekistics in some cases argues that in order for human settlements to expand efficiently and economically we must reorganize the way in which the villages, towns, cities, metropolises are formed.

As Doxiadis put it, "... This field (ekistics) is a science, even if in our times it is usually considered a technology and an art, without the foundations of ascience - a mistake for which we pay very heavily." Having recorded very successfully the destructions of the ekistic wealth in Greece during WWII, Doxiadis became convinced that human settlements are subjectable to systematic investigation. Doxiadis, being aware of the unifying power of systems thinking and particularly of the biological and evolutionary reference models as used by many famous biologists-philosophers of his generation, especially Sir Julian Huxley (1887–1975), Theodosius Dobzhansky (1900–75), Dennis Gabor (1900–79), René Dubos (1901–82), George G. Simpson (1902–84), and Conrad Waddington (1905–75), used the biological model to describe the "ekistic behavior" of anthropos (the five principles) and the evolutionary model to explain the morphogenesis of human settlements (the eleven forces, the hierarchical structure of human settlements, dynapolis, ecumenopolis). Finally, he formulated a general theory which considers human settlements as living organisms capable of evolution, an evolution that might be guided by Man using "ekistic knowledge".

Units

Doxiadis believed that the conclusion from biological and social experience was clear: to avoid chaos we must organize our system of life from anthropos (individual) to ecumenopolis (global city) in hierarchical levels, represented by human settlements. So he articulated a general hierarchical scale with fifteen levels of ekistic units:

anthropos – 1
room – 2
house – 5
housegroup (hamlet) – 40
small neighborhood (village) – 250
neighborhood – 1,500
small polis (town) – 10,000
polis (city) – 75,000
small metropolis – 500,000
metropolis – 4 million
small megalopolis – 25 million
megalopolis – 150 million
small eperopolis – 750 million
eperopolis – 7.5 billion
ecumenopolis – 50 billion

The population figures above are for Doxiadis' ideal future ekistic units for the year 2100, at which time he estimated (in 1968) that Earth would achieve zero population growth at a population of 50,000,000,000 with human civilization being powered by fusion energy.

Publications
The Ekistics and the New Habitat, printed from 1957 to 2006 and began calling for new papers to be published online in 2019.

Ekistics is a 1968 book by Konstantinos Doxiadis, often titled Introduction to Ekistics.

See also 
Arcology
Conurbation
Consolidated city-county
Global city
Human ecosystem
Megacity
Megalopolis (term)
Metropolitan area
Permaculture
Principles of intelligent urbanism

Further reading
 Doxiadis, Konstantinos Ekistics 1968

References

External links 

The Institute of Ekistics
World Society for Ekistics
 
Ekistic Units
City of the Future

Urban studies and planning terminology
Architectural terminology